The Battle of Piribebuy was fought on 12 August 1869 in the Paraguayan town of Piribebuy, which was then serving as a temporary capital of the Paraguayan government. The Paraguayan defenders, who were poorly armed and included children, fought the attacks of the Allied forces, led by French-born Brazilian general prince Gaston of Orleans, the Count of Eu, son-in-law of Emperor Pedro II of Brazil. The town refused two peace envoys calling for surrender, sent by the Count of Eu. At 0400, the Brazilian batteries surrounding the town started a bombardment which lasted until 0800, when the infantry charged. General João Manuel Mena Barreto was mortally wounded leading a cavalry charge against the Paraguayans.

The battle lasted for five hours, with the Allies, who had overwhelming numerical advantage, capturing the town. The town's hospital was burned and official documents were lost in the resulting fire.

Gallery

References

Bibliography 
 Efraím Cardozo (1970). Hace 100 años. Crónicas de la guerra de 1864-1870. Tomo III. 
 Juan Bautista Rivarola Matto (1986). Diagonal de sangre.

External links 
  Paraguay.com
  Nuevo Mundo

Conflicts in 1869
Battles involving Paraguay
Battles involving Brazil
Battles of the Paraguayan War
History of Cordillera Department
August 1869 events
1869 in Paraguay